GTFO is an acronym for "Get the fuck out", which is commonly used in SMS language

GTFO may also refer to:
”GTFO” (creator), by Michael A. Gallegos
 GTFO (film), a 2015 American documentary on gaming
 "GTFO" (song), a 2018 song by Mariah Carey
 GTFO (video game), a 2019 horror, shooter co-op